Wilhelm Michel (9 August 1877, Metz –  16 April 1942, Darmstadt) was a German writer who won the 1925 Georg Büchner Prize.

Bibliography 

 Apollon und Dionysos. Dualistische Streifzüge 1904
 Rainer Maria Rilke 1905
 Der Zuschauer. Gedichte 1907
 Das Teuflische und Groteske in der Kunst 1911
 Friedrich Hölderlin 1912
 Der Mensch versagt 1920
 Hölderlins abendländische Wendung 1923
 Hölderlin und der deutsche Geist 1924
 Das Leiden am Ich 1930
 Das Leben Friedrich Hölderlins 1940

Writers from Metz
1877 births
1942 deaths
German male writers